Paul E. Tracy is an American criminologist and professor at the University of Massachusetts Lowell. He is also the editor-in-chief of Crime & Delinquency.

His research interests focus on juvenile delinquency and criminal careers.

References

External links
Faculty page

Living people
Academic journal editors
American criminologists
University of Massachusetts Lowell faculty
Year of birth missing (living people)